Alfred is an application launcher and productivity application for macOS. Alfred is free, though an optional paid upgrade ('Powerpack') is available.

Using a keyboard shortcut chosen by the user, Alfred provides a quick way to find and launch applications and files on the Mac or to search the web both with predefined keywords for often-used sites such as Amazon.com, IMDb, Wikipedia and many others, with the ability to add users' custom searches for the sites most applicable to them. In its free version it also serves as a calculator, spell-checker and a convenient interface for controlling the Mac with system commands.

Alfred's capabilities can be extended with the Powerpack which provides additional features, including the ability to directly navigate your file system, perform actions on the files and applications you search for, control iTunes, open Address Book entries, save text clips, and more. Alfred also allows you to set global hotkeys, access your URL history and create auto-expanding text snippets.

There are hundreds of user-created extensions. A large repository for user-created workflows and themes created for Alfred 2 and 3 can be found at Packal.

Alfred can be used as an alternative to macOS launchers such as Quicksilver and was created primarily with ease of use in mind. Alfred has garnered praise including 2011 Macworld Editors' Choice Award for the best Mac hardware and software of the year, being named TUAW's Best of 2011 Mac utility app and one of The 10 Best Mac Apps of 2011 by Mashable. It has also been recognised as one of 10 Must-have Apps for Mac Newbies by Maclife.com  and a runner-up in MacStories Mac App of 2011 reader's choice.

See also
 Comparison of application launchers

References

External links 

 
 Packal.org

Application launchers
MacOS-only software